Maxim Kapiturov (born October 25, 1995) is a Russia professional ice hockey player. He is currently playing with HC Lada Togliatti of the Supreme Hockey League (VHL).

Kapiturov made his Kontinental Hockey League debut playing with Amur Khabarovsk during the 2019–20 season.

References

External links

1995 births
Living people
Amur Khabarovsk players
HC Lada Togliatti players
Sokol Krasnoyarsk players
Kazzinc-Torpedo players
Russian ice hockey centres
Russian ice hockey right wingers